Jonathan Williams (c. 1752 – 19 August 1829) was a Welsh clergyman, schoolmaster and antiquarian writer.

He was born at Rhayader, some time between 1752 and 1754, the son of a draper, and had two brothers who also went into the church.  He studied at Pembroke College, Oxford, going on to teach at the grammar school in Leominster on the English-Welsh border.  He was also curate of nearby Eyton.  At Leominster he got married, and had two daughters.

Works
History of Leominster
History of Radnorshire (1905) (posthumously published)

Sources
Welsh Biography Online

1750s births
1829 deaths
18th-century Welsh historians
19th-century Welsh historians
Year of birth uncertain
People from Powys